This is a list of published International Organization for Standardization (ISO) standards and other deliverables. For a complete and up-to-date list of all the ISO standards, see the ISO catalogue.

The standards are protected by copyright and most of them must be purchased. However, about 300 of the standards produced by ISO and IEC's Joint Technical Committee 1 (JTC 1) have been made freely and publicly available.

ISO 24000 – ISO 24999
 ISO 24013:2006 Optics and photonics – Lasers and laser-related equipment – Measurement of phase retardation of optical components for polarized laser radiation
 ISO 24014 Public transport – Interoperable fare management system
 ISO 24014-1:2015 Part 1: Architecture
 ISO/TR 24014-2:2013 Part 2: Business practices
 ISO/TR 24014-3:2013 Part 3: Complementary concepts to Part 1 for multi-application media
 ISO 24097 Intelligent transport systems – Using web services (machine-machine delivery) for ITS service delivery
 ISO 24097-1:2017 Part 1: Realization of interoperable web services
 ISO/TR 24097-2:2015 Part 2: Elaboration of interoperable web services' interfaces
 ISO/TR 24098:2007 Intelligent transport systems – System architecture, taxonomy and terminology – Procedures for developing ITS deployment plans utilizing ITS system architecture
 ISO 24099:2011 Navigation data delivery structures and protocols
 ISO 24100:2010 Intelligent transport systems – Basic principles for personal data protection in probe vehicle information services
 ISO 24101 Intelligent transport systems – Communications access for land mobiles (CALM) – Application management
 ISO 24101-1:2008 Part 1: General requirements
 ISO 24101-2:2010 Part 2: Conformance test
 ISO 24102 Intelligent transport systems – Communications access for land mobiles (CALM) – ITS station management
 ISO 24102-1:2013 Part 1: Local management
 ISO 24102-2:2015 Part 2: Remote management of ITS-SCUs
 ISO 24102-3:2013 Part 3: Service access points
 ISO 24102-4:2013 Part 4: Station-internal management communications
 ISO 24102-5:2013 Part 5: Fast service advertisement protocol (FSAP)
 ISO 24103:2009 Intelligent transport systems – Communications access for land mobiles (CALM) – Media adapted interface layer (MAIL)
 ISO 24113: the top-level standard for the (voluntary) mitigation of orbital space debris 
 ISO 24153:2009 Random sampling and randomization procedures
 ISO 24155:2016 Hydrometry – Hydrometric data transmission systems – Specification of system requirements
 ISO 24156 Graphic notations for concept modelling in terminology work and its relationship with UML
 ISO 24156-1:2014 Part 1: Guidelines for using UML notation in terminology work
 ISO 24157:2008 Ophthalmic optics and instruments – Reporting aberrations of the human eye
 ISO 24294:2013 Timber – Round and sawn timber – Vocabulary
 ISO/TS 24348:2014 Ophthalmic optics – Spectacle frames – Method for the simulation of wear and detection of nickel release from metal and combination spectacle frames
 ISO 24393:2008 Rolling bearings - Linear motion rolling bearings - Vocabulary
 ISO 24408:2005 Ships and marine technology - Position-indicating lights for life-saving appliances - Testing, inspection and marking of production units
 ISO 24409 Ships and marine technology - Design, location and use of shipboard safety signs, safety-related signs, safety notices and safety markings
 ISO 24409-1:2010 Part 1: Design principles
 ISO 24409-2:2014 Part 2: Catalogue
 ISO 24409-3:2014 Part 3: Code of practice
 ISO 24497 Non-destructive testing - Metal magnetic memory
 ISO 24497-1:2007 Part 1: Vocabulary
 ISO 24502:2010 Ergonomics - Accessible design - Specification of age-related luminance contrast for coloured light
 ISO 24503:2011 Ergonomics - Accessible design - Tactile dots and bars on consumer products
 ISO 24510:2007 Activities relating to drinking water and wastewater services – Guidelines for the assessment and for the improvement of the service to users
 ISO 24517 Document management - Engineering document format using PDF
 ISO 24517-1:2008 Part 1: Use of PDF 1.6 (PDF/E-1)
 ISO 24518:2015 Activities relating to drinking water and wastewater services – Crisis management of water utilities
 ISO/TS 24520:2017 Service activities relating to drinking water supply systems and wastewater systems – Crisis management – Good practice for technical aspects
 ISO 24521:2016 Activities relating to drinking water and wastewater services – Guidelines for the management of basic on-site domestic wastewater services
 ISO 24523:2017 Service activities relating to drinking water supply systems and wastewater systems – Guidelines for benchmarking of water utilities
 ISO/TR 24529:2008 Intelligent transport systems – Systems architecture – Use of unified modelling language (UML) in ITS International Standards and deliverables
 ISO/TS 24530 Traffic and Travel Information (TTI) – TTI via Transport Protocol Experts Group (TPEG) Extensible Markup Language (XML)
 ISO/TS 24530-1:2006 Part 1: Introduction, common data types and tpegML
 ISO/TS 24530-2:2006 Part 2: tpeg-locML
 ISO/TS 24530-3:2006 Part 3: tpeg-rtmML
 ISO/TS 24530-4:2006 Part 4: tpeg-ptiML
 ISO 24531:2013 Intelligent transport systems – System architecture, taxonomy and terminology – Using XML in ITS standards, data registries and data dictionaries
 ISO/TR 24532:2006 Intelligent transport systems – Systems architecture, taxonomy and terminology – Using CORBA (Common Object Request Broker Architecture) in ITS standards, data registries and data dictionaries
 ISO/TS 24533:2012 Intelligent transport systems – Electronic information exchange to facilitate the movement of freight and its intermodal transfer – Road transport information exchange methodology
 ISO 24534 Intelligent transport systems – Automatic vehicle and equipment identification – Electronic registration identification (ERI) for vehicles
 ISO 24534-1:2010 Part 1: Architecture
 ISO 24534-2:2010 Part 2: Operational requirements
 ISO 24534-3:2016 Part 3: Vehicle data
 ISO 24534-4:2010 Part 4: Secure communications using asymmetrical techniques
 ISO 24534-5:2011 Part 5: Secure communications using symmetrical techniques
 ISO 24535:2007 Intelligent transport systems – Automatic vehicle identification – Basic electronic registration identification (Basic ERI)
 ISO/IEC 24570:2005 Software engineering - NESMA functional size measurement method version 2.1 - Definitions and counting guidelines for the application of Function Point Analysis
 ISO/TR 24578:2012 Hydrometry – Acoustic Doppler profiler – Method and application for measurement of flow in open channels
 ISO 24610 Language resource management - Feature structures
 ISO 24610-1:2006 Part 1: Feature structure representation
 ISO 24610-2:2011 Part 2: Feature system declaration
 ISO 24611:2012 Language resource management - Morpho-syntactic annotation framework (MAF)
 ISO 24612:2012 Language resource management - Linguistic annotation framework (LAF)
 ISO 24613:2008 Language resource management - Lexical markup framework (LMF)
 ISO 24613-1:2019 Part 1: Core model
 ISO 24613-2:2020 Part 2: Machine-readable dictionary (MRD) model
 ISO 24614 Language resource management - Word segmentation of written texts
 ISO 24614-1:2010 Part 1: Basic concepts and general principles
 ISO 24614-2:2011 Part 2: Word segmentation for Chinese, Japanese and Korean
 ISO 24615 Language resource management — Syntactic annotation framework (SynAF)
 ISO 24615-1:2014 Part 1: Syntactic model
 ISO 24615-2:2018 Part 2: XML serialization (Tiger vocabulary)
 ISO 24616:2012 Language resources management - Multilingual information framework
 ISO 24617 Language resource management — Semantic annotation framework (SemAF)
 ISO 24617-1:2012 Part 1: Time and events (SemAF-Time, ISO-TimeML)
 ISO 24617-2:2020 Part 2: Part 2: Dialogue acts
 ISO 24617-4:2014 Part 4: Semantic roles (SemAF-SR)
 ISO/TS 24617-5:2014 Part 5: Discourse structure (SemAF-DS)
 ISO 24617-6:2016 Part 6: Principles of semantic annotation (SemAF Principles)
 ISO 24617-7:2020 Part 7: Spatial information (ISOspace)
 ISO 24617-8:2016 Part 8: Semantic relations in discourse, core annotation schema (DR-core)
 ISO 24617-9:2019 Part 9: Reference annotation framework (RAF)
 ISO 24619:2011 Language resource management - Persistent identification and sustainable access (PISA)
 ISO/TS 24620 Language resource management - Controlled natural language (CNL)
 ISO/TS 24620-1:2015 Part 1: Basic concepts and principles
 ISO 24622 Language resource management - Component Metadata Infrastructure (CMDI)
 ISO 24622-1:2015 Part 1: The Component Metadata Model
 ISO 24623 Language resource management — Corpus query lingua franca (CQLF)
 ISO 24623-1:2018 Part 1: Metamodel
 ISO 24624:2016 Language resource management - Transcription of spoken language
 ISO/IEC 24700:2005 Quality and performance of office equipment that contains reused components
 ISO/IEC 24702:2006 Information technology - Generic cabling - Industrial premises
 ISO/IEC 24703:2004 Information technology - Participant Identifiers
 ISO/IEC TR 24704:2004 Information technology - Customer premises cabling for wireless access points
 ISO/IEC 24707:2018  Information technology – Common Logic (CL) – A framework for a family of logic-based languages
 ISO/IEC 24708:2008 Information technology – Biometrics – BioAPI Interworking Protocol
 ISO/IEC 24709 Information technology – Conformance testing for the biometric application programming interface (BioAPI)
 ISO/IEC 24709-1:2007 Part 1: Methods and procedures
 ISO/IEC 24709-2:2007 Part 2: Test assertions for biometric service providers
 ISO/IEC 24709-3:2011 Part 3: Test assertions for BioAPI frameworks
 ISO/IEC TR 24710:2005 Information technology - Radio frequency identification for item management - Elementary tag licence plate functionality for ISO/IEC 18000 air interface definitions
 ISO/IEC 24713 Information technology – Biometric profiles for interoperability and data interchange
 ISO/IEC 24713-1:2008 Part 1: Overview of biometric systems and biometric profiles
 ISO/IEC 24713-2:2008 Part 2: Physical access control for employees at airports
 ISO/IEC 24713-3:2009 Part 3: Biometrics-based verification and identification of seafarers
 ISO/IEC TR 24714 Information technology - Biometrics - Jurisdictional and societal considerations for commercial applications
 ISO/IEC TR 24714-1:2008 Part 1: General guidance
 ISO/IEC TR 24715:2006 Information technology - Programming languages, their environments and system software interfaces - Technical Report on the Conflicts between the ISO/IEC 9945 (POSIX) and the Linux Standard Base (ISO/IEC 23360)
 ISO/IEC TR 24716:2007 Information technology - Programming languages, their environment and system software interfaces - Native COBOL Syntax for XML Support
 ISO/IEC TR 24717:2009 Information technology - Programming languages, their environments and system software interfaces - Collection classes for programming language COBOL
 ISO/IEC TR 24718:2005 Information technology - Programming languages - Guide for the use of the Ada Ravenscar Profile in high integrity systems
 ISO/IEC TR 24720:2008 Information technology - Automatic identification and data capture techniques - Guidelines for direct part marking (DPM)
 ISO/IEC TR 24722:2015 Information technology – Biometrics – Multimodal and other multibiometric fusion
 ISO/IEC 24723:2010 Information technology - Automatic identification and data capture techniques - GS1 Composite bar code symbology specification
 ISO/IEC 24724:2011 Information technology - Automatic identification and data capture techniques - GS1 DataBar bar code symbology specification
 ISO/IEC 24727 Identification cards – Integrated circuit card programming interfaces
 ISO/IEC 24728:2006 Information technology - Automatic identification and data capture techniques - MicroPDF417 bar code symbology specification
 ISO/IEC TR 24729 Information technology - Radio frequency identification for item management - Implementation guidelines
 ISO/IEC TR 24729-1:2008 Part 1: RFID-enabled labels and packaging supporting ISO/IEC 18000-6C
 ISO/IEC TR 24729-2:2008 Part 2: Recycling and RFID tags
 ISO/IEC TR 24729-3:2009 Part 3: Implementation and operation of UHF RFID Interrogator systems in logistics applications
 ISO/IEC TR 24729-4:2009 Part 4: Tag data security
 ISO/IEC 24730 Information technology - Real-time locating systems (RTLS)
 ISO/IEC 24730-1:2014 Part 1: Application programming interface (API)
 ISO/IEC 24730-2:2012 Part 2: Direct Sequence Spread Spectrum (DSSS) 2,4 GHz air interface protocol
 ISO/IEC 24730-5:2010 Part 5: Chirp spread spectrum (CSS) at 2,4 GHz air interface
 ISO/IEC 24730-21:2012 Part 21: Direct Sequence Spread Spectrum (DSSS) 2,4 GHz air interface protocol: Transmitters operating with a single spread code and employing a DBPSK data encoding and BPSK spreading scheme
 ISO/IEC 24730-22:2012 Part 22: Direct Sequence Spread Spectrum (DSSS) 2,4 GHz air interface protocol: Transmitters operating with multiple spread codes and employing a QPSK data encoding and Walsh offset QPSK (WOQPSK) spreading scheme
 ISO/IEC 24730-61:2013 Part 61: Low rate pulse repetition frequency Ultra Wide Band (UWB) air interface
 ISO/IEC 24730-62:2013 Part 62: High rate pulse repetition frequency Ultra Wide Band (UWB) air interface
 ISO/IEC TR 24731 Information technology - Programming languages, their environments and system software interfaces - Extensions to the C library
 ISO/IEC TR 24731-1:2007 Part 1: Bounds-checking interfaces
 ISO/IEC TR 24731-2:2010 Part 2: Dynamic Allocation Functions
 ISO/IEC TR 24732:2009 Information technology - Programming languages, their environments and system software interfaces - Extension for the programming language C to support decimal floating-point arithmetic
 ISO/IEC TR 24733:2011 Information technology - Programming languages, their environments and system software interfaces - Extensions for the programming language C++ to support decimal floating-point arithmetic
 ISO/IEC 24738:2006 Information technology – Icon symbols and functions for multimedia link attributes
 ISO/IEC 24739 Information technology - AT Attachment with Packet Interface - 7
 ISO/IEC 24739-1:2009 Part 1: Register Delivered Command Set, Logical Register Set (ATA/ATAPI-7 V1)
 ISO/IEC 24739-2:2009 Part 2: Parallel transport protocols and physical interconnect (ATA/ATAPI-7)
 ISO/IEC 24739-3:2010 Part 3: Serial transport protocols and physical interconnect (ATA/ATAPI-7 V3)
 ISO/IEC 24740:2008 Information technology - Responsive Link (RL)
 ISO/IEC TR 24741:2007 Information technology – Biometrics tutorial
 ISO/IEC 24744:2014 Software Engineering – Metamodel for Development Methodologies
 ISO/IEC 24745:2011 Information technology - Security techniques - Biometric information protection
 ISO/IEC TR 24746:2005 Information technology - Generic cabling for customer premises - Mid-span DTE power insertion
 ISO/IEC 24747:2009 Information technology - Programming languages, their environments and system software interfaces - Extensions to the C Library to support mathematical special functions
 ISO/IEC 24748 Systems and software engineering - Life cycle management
 ISO/IEC/IEEE 24748-1:2018 Part 1: Guidelines for life cycle management
 ISO/IEC/IEEE 24748-2:2018 Part 2: Guidelines for the application of ISO/IEC/IEEE 15288 (System life cycle processes)
 ISO/IEC TR 24748-3:2011 Part 3: Guide to the application of ISO/IEC 12207 (Software life cycle processes)
 ISO/IEC/IEEE 24748-4:2016 Part 4: Systems engineering planning
 ISO/IEC/IEEE 24748-5:2017 Part 5: Software development planning
 ISO/IEC TS 24748-6:2016 Part 6: System integration engineering
 ISO/IEC TR 24750:2007 Information technology - Assessment and mitigation of installed balanced cabling channels in order to support of 10GBASE-T
 ISO/IEC 24751 Information technology - Individualized adaptability and accessibility in e-learning, education and training
 ISO/IEC 24751-1:2008 Part 1: Framework and reference model
 ISO/IEC 24751-2:2008 Part 2: "Access for all" personal needs and preferences for digital delivery
 ISO/IEC 24751-3:2008 Part 3: "Access for all" digital resource description
 ISO/IEC 24752 Information technology – User interfaces – Universal remote console
 ISO/IEC 24753:2011 Information technology - Radio frequency identification (RFID) for item management - Application protocol: encoding and processing rules for sensors and batteries
 ISO/IEC 24754 Information technology - Document description and processing languages - Minimum requirements for specifying document rendering systems
 ISO/IEC 24754-1:2008 Part 1: Feature specifications for document rendering systems
 ISO/IEC TR 24754-2:2011 Part 2: Formatting specifications for document rendering systems
 ISO/IEC 24755:2007 Information technology - Screen icons and symbols for personal mobile communication devices
 ISO/IEC 24756:2009 Information technology - Framework for specifying a common access profile (CAP) of needs and capabilities of users, systems, and their environments
 ISO/IEC 24757:2008 Information technology - Keyboard interaction model - Machine-readable keyboard description
 ISO/IEC 24759:2017 Information technology - Security techniques - Test requirements for cryptographic modules
 ISO/IEC 24760 Information technology - Security techniques - A framework for identity management
 ISO/IEC 24760-1:2011 Part 1: Terminology and concepts
 ISO/IEC 24760-2:2015 Part 2: Reference architecture and requirements
 ISO/IEC 24760-3:2016 Part 3: Practice
 ISO/IEC 24761:2009 Information technology - Security techniques - Authentication context for biometrics
 ISO/IEC 24762:2008 Information technology – Security techniques – Guidelines for information and communications technology disaster recovery services
 ISO/IEC TR 24763:2011 Information technology - Learning, education and training - Conceptual Reference Model for Competency Information and Related Objects
 ISO/IEC 24764:2010 Information technology - Generic cabling systems for data centres
 ISO/IEC/IEEE 24765:2017 Systems and software engineering - Vocabulary
 ISO/IEC TR 24766:2009 Information technology - Systems and software engineering - Guide for requirements engineering tool capabilities
 ISO/IEC 24767 Information technology - Home network security
 ISO/IEC 24767-1:2008 Part 1: Security requirements
 ISO/IEC 24767-2:2009 Part 2: Internal security services: Secure Communication Protocol for Middleware (SCPM)
 ISO/IEC 24769 Information technology - Real-time locating systems (RTLS) device conformance test methods
 ISO/IEC 24769-2:2013 Part 2: Test methods for air interface communication at 2,4 GHz
 ISO/IEC 24769-5:2012 Part 5: Test methods for chirp spread spectrum (CSS) at 2,4 GHz air interface
 ISO/IEC 24769-61:2015 Part 61: Low rate pulse repetition frequency Ultra Wide Band (UWB) air interface
 ISO/IEC 24769-62:2015 Part 62: High rate pulse repetition frequency Ultra Wide Band (UWB) air interface
 ISO/IEC 24770:2012 Information technology - Real-time locating system (RTLS) device performance test methods - Test methods for air interface communication at 2,4 GHz
 ISO/IEC 24770-61:2015 Part 61: Low rate pulse repetition frequency Ultra Wide Band (UWB) air interface
 ISO/IEC 24770-62:2015 Part 62: High rate pulse repetition frequency Ultra Wide Band (UWB) air interface
 ISO/IEC 24771:2014 Information technology – Telecommunications and information exchange between systems – MAC/PHY standard for ad hoc wireless network to support QoS in an industrial work environment
 ISO/IEC TR 24772 Programming languages — Guidance to avoiding vulnerabilities in programming languages
 ISO/IEC TR 24772-1:2019 Part 1: Language-independent guidance
 ISO/IEC TR 24772-2:2020 Part 2: Ada
 ISO/IEC TR 24772-3:2020 Part 3: C
 ISO/IEC 24773:2008 Software engineering - Certification of software engineering professionals - Comparison framework
 ISO/IEC TR 24774:2010 Systems and software engineering - Life cycle management - Guidelines for process description
 ISO/IEC 24775 Information technology - Storage management
 ISO/IEC 24775-1:2014 Part 1: Overview
 ISO/IEC 24775-2:2014 Part 2: Common Architecture
 ISO/IEC 24775-3:2014 Part 3: Common Profiles
 ISO/IEC 24775-4:2014 Part 4: Block Devices
 ISO/IEC 24775-5:2014 Part 5: File systems
 ISO/IEC 24775-6:2014 Part 6: Fabric
 ISO/IEC 24775-7:2014 Part 7: Host Elements
 ISO/IEC 24775-8:2014 Part 8: Media Libraries
 ISO/IEC 24778:2008 Information technology - Automatic identification and data capture techniques - Aztec Code bar code symbology specification
 ISO/IEC 24779 Information technology - Cross-jurisdictional and societal aspects of implementation of biometric technologies - Pictograms, icons and symbols for use with biometric systems
 ISO/IEC 24779-1:2016 Part 1: General principles
 ISO/IEC 24779-4:2017 Part 4: Fingerprint applications
 ISO/IEC 24779-9:2015 Part 9: Vascular applications
 ISO/IEC TR 24785:2009 Information technology – Taxonomy of cultural and linguistic adaptability user requirements
 ISO/IEC 24786:2009 Information technology – User interfaces – Accessible user interface for accessibility settings
 ISO/IEC 24787:2010 Information technology – Identification cards – On-card biometric comparison
 ISO/IEC 24789 Identification cards – Card service life
 ISO/IEC 24789-1:2012 Part 1: Application profiles and requirements
 ISO/IEC 24789-2:2011 Part 2: Methods of evaluation
 ISO/IEC 24791 Information technology - Radio frequency identification (RFID) for item management - Software system infrastructure
 ISO/IEC 24791-1:2010 Part 1: Architecture
 ISO/IEC 24791-2:2011 Part 2: Data management
 ISO/IEC 24791-3:2014 Part 3: Device management
 ISO/IEC 24791-5:2012 Part 5: Device interface
 ISO/IEC 24792:2010 Information technology – Telecommunications and information exchange between systems – Multicast Session Management Protocol (MSMP)
 ISO/IEC 24793 Information technology – Mobile multicast communications
 ISO/IEC 24793-1:2010 Framework
 ISO/IEC 24793-2:2010 Protocol over native IP multicast networks
 ISO/IEC 24800 Information technology - JPSearch
 ISO/IEC TR 24800-1:2012 Part 1: System framework and components
 ISO/IEC 24800-2:2011 Part 2: Registration, identification and management of schema and ontology
 ISO/IEC 24800-3:2010 Part 3: Query format
 ISO/IEC 24800-4:2010 Part 4: File format for metadata embedded in image data (JPEG and JPEG 2000)
 ISO/IEC 24800-5:2011 Part 5: Data interchange format between image repositories
 ISO/IEC 24800-6:2012 Part 6: Reference software
 ISO 24801 Recreational diving services – Requirements for the training of recreational scuba divers
 ISO 24801-1:2014 Part 1: Level 1 – Supervised diver
 ISO 24801-2:2014 Part 2: Level 2 – Autonomous diver
 ISO 24801-3:2014 Part 3: Level 3 – Dive leader
 ISO 24802 Recreational diving services – Requirements for the training of scuba instructors
 ISO 24802-1:2014 Part 1: Level 1
 ISO 24802-2:2014 Part 2: Level 2
 ISO 24803:2017 Recreational diving services – Requirements for recreational diving providers
 ISO/IEC 24824 Information technology – Generic applications of ASN.1
 ISO/IEC 24824-1:2007 Fast infoset
 ISO/IEC 24824-2:2006 Fast Web Services
 ISO/IEC 24824-3:2008 Fast infoset security
 ISO/TR 24971:2013 Medical devices – Guidance on the application of ISO 14971
 ISO 24978:2009 Intelligent transport systems – ITS Safety and emergency messages using any available wireless media – Data registry procedures

ISO 25000 – ISO 25999
 ISO/IEC 25000:2014 Systems and software engineering - Systems and software Quality Requirements and Evaluation (SQuaRE) - Guide to SQuaRE
 ISO/IEC 25001:2014 Systems and software engineering - Systems and software Quality Requirements and Evaluation (SQuaRE) - Planning and management
 ISO/IEC 25010:2011 Systems and software engineering - Systems and software Quality Requirements and Evaluation (SQuaRE) - System and software quality models
 ISO/IEC TS 25011:2017 Information technology - Systems and software quality requirements and evaluation (SQuaRE) - Service quality models
 ISO/IEC 25012:2008 Software engineering - Software product Quality Requirements and Evaluation (SQuaRE) - Data quality model
 ISO/IEC 25020:2007 Software engineering - Software product Quality Requirements and Evaluation (SQuaRE) - Measurement reference model and guide
 ISO/IEC 25021:2012 Systems and software engineering - Systems and software Quality Requirements and Evaluation (SQuaRE) - Quality measure elements
 ISO/IEC 25022:2016 Systems and software engineering - Systems and software quality requirements and evaluation (SQuaRE) - Measurement of quality in use
 ISO/IEC 25023:2016 Systems and software engineering - Systems and software Quality Requirements and Evaluation (SQuaRE) - Measurement of system and software product quality
 ISO/IEC 25024:2015 Systems and software engineering - Systems and software Quality Requirements and Evaluation (SQuaRE) - Measurement of data quality
 ISO/IEC 25030:2007 Software engineering - Software product Quality Requirements and Evaluation (SQuaRE) - Quality requirements
 ISO/IEC 25040:2011 Systems and software engineering - Systems and software Quality Requirements and Evaluation (SQuaRE) - Evaluation process
 ISO/IEC 25041:2012 Systems and software engineering - Systems and software Quality Requirements and Evaluation (SQuaRE) - Evaluation guide for developers, acquirers and independent evaluators
 ISO/IEC 25045:2010 Systems and software engineering - Systems and software Quality Requirements and Evaluation (SQuaRE) - Evaluation module for recoverability
 ISO/IEC 25051:2014 Software engineering - Systems and software Quality Requirements and Evaluation (SQuaRE) - Requirements for quality of Ready to Use Software Product (RUSP) and instructions for testing
 ISO/IEC TR 25060:2010 Systems and software engineering - Systems and software product Quality Requirements and Evaluation (SQuaRE) - Common Industry Format (CIF) for usability: General framework for usability-related information
 ISO/IEC 25062:2006 Software engineering - Software product Quality Requirements and Evaluation (SQuaRE) - Common Industry Format (CIF) for usability test reports
 ISO/IEC 25063:2014 Systems and software engineering - Systems and software product Quality Requirements and Evaluation (SQuaRE) - Common Industry Format (CIF) for usability: Context of use description
 ISO/IEC 25064:2013 Systems and software engineering - Software product Quality Requirements and Evaluation (SQuaRE) - Common Industry Format (CIF) for usability: User needs report
 ISO/IEC 25066:2016 Systems and software engineering - Systems and software Quality Requirements and Evaluation (SQuaRE) - Common Industry Format (CIF) for Usability—Evaluation Report
 ISO/TR 25100:2012 Intelligent transport systems – Systems architecture – Harmonization of ITS data concepts
 ISO/TR 25102:2008 Intelligent transport systems – System architecture – 'Use Case' pro-forma template
 ISO/TR 25104:2008 Intelligent transport systems – System architecture, taxonomy, terminology and data modelling – Training requirements for ITS architecture
 ISO/TS 25110:2017 Electronic fee collection – Interface definition for on-board account using integrated circuit card (ICC)
 ISO 25111:2009 Intelligent transport systems – Communications access for land mobiles (CALM) – General requirements for using public networks
 ISO 25112:2010 Intelligent transport systems – Communications access for land mobiles (CALM) – Mobile wireless broadband using IEEE 802.16
 ISO 25113:2010 Intelligent transport systems – Communications access for land mobiles (CALM) – Mobile wireless broadband using HC-SDMA
 ISO/TS 25114:2010 Intelligent transport systems – Probe data reporting management (PDRM)
 ISO 25119 Tractors and machinery for agriculture and forestry – Safety-related parts of control systems
 ISO 25119-1:2018 Part 1: General principles for design and development
 ISO 25119-2:2018 Part 2: Concept phase
 ISO 25119-3:2018 Part 3: Series development, hardware and software
 ISO 25119-4:2018 Part 4: Production, operation, modification and supporting processes
 ISO 25178 Geometrical product specifications (GPS) – Surface texture: Areal
 ISO/IEC 25185 Identification cards – Integrated circuit card authentication protocols
 ISO/IEC 25185-1:2016 Part 1: Protocol for Lightweight
 ISO 25237:2017 Health informatics – Pseudonymization
 ISO/TS 25237:2008 Health informatics – Pseudonymization
 ISO 25239 Friction stir welding - Aluminium
 ISO 25239-1:2011 Part 1: Vocabulary
 ISO/TR 25257:2009 Health informatics – Business requirements for an international coding system for medicinal products
 ISO/TS 25377:2007 Hydrometric uncertainty guidance (HUG)
 ISO 25378:2011 Geometrical product specifications (GPS) - Characteristics and conditions - Definitions
 ISO/TR 25417:2007 Acoustics – Definitions of basic quantities and terms
 ISO/IEC 25434:2008 Information technology - Data interchange on 120 mm and 80 mm optical disk using +R DL format - Capacity: 8,55 Gbytes and 2,66 Gbytes per side (recording speed up to 16X)
 ISO/IEC 25435:2006 Data Interchange on 60 mm Read-Only ODC - Capacity: 1,8 Gbytes (UMDTM)
 ISO/IEC 25436:2006 Information technology - Eiffel: Analysis, Design and Programming Language
 ISO/IEC 25437:2012 Information technology – Telecommunications and information exchange between systems – WS-Session – Web services for application session services
 ISO/IEC TR 25438:2006 Information technology - Common Language Infrastructure (CLI) - Technical Report: Common Generics
 ISO 25539 Cardiovascular implants - Endovascular devices
 ISO 25539-1:2017 Part 1: Endovascular prostheses
 ISO 25539-2:2012 Part 2: Vascular stents
 ISO 25539-3:2011 Part 3: Vena cava filters
 ISO 25577:2013 Information and documentation - MarcXchange
 ISO 25639 Exhibitions, shows, fairs and conventions
 ISO 25639-1:2008 Part 1: Vocabulary
 ISO 25639-2:2008 Part 2: Measurement procedures for statistical purposes
 ISO/TR 25679:2005 Mechanical testing of metals – Symbols and definitions in published standards
 ISO 25720:2009 Health informatics – Genomic Sequence Variation Markup Language (GSVML)
 ISO/TR 25901 Welding and allied processes - Vocabulary
 ISO/TR 25901-1:2016 Part 1: General terms
 ISO/TR 25901-3:2016 Part 3: Welding processes
 ISO/TR 25901-4:2016 Part 4: Arc welding
 ISO 25947 Fireworks – Categories 1, 2 and 3
 ISO 25947-1:2017 Part 1: Terminology
 ISO 25964 Information and documentation - Thesauri and interoperability with other vocabularies

Notes

References

External links 
 International Organization for Standardization
 ISO Certification Provider
 ISO Consultant

International Organization for Standardization